This is a list of seasons played by Shamrock Rovers Football Club in Irish and European football, from 1922 (year of entry into the League of Ireland) to the most recent completed season. The list details the club's achievements in all major competitions, and the top scorers for each league season.

Shamrock Rovers are recognised as being founded in 1901 (some sources suggest 1899), and were elected to the League of Ireland in 1922. They reached the final of the inaugural FAI Cup in the season before their election to the league and won the league title at their first attempt the following year. The club have won the League of Ireland a record 17 times, the FAI Cup a record 24 times, the League of Ireland Shield a record 18 times, the League of Ireland Cup once and have participated in European competition since 1958, when they became the first Irish side to do so. The club have finished bottom of the league once in their 94 seasons of participation, when they had to apply for re-election in 1976. The club were relegated for the first time in 2005 following an eight-point deduction and a play-off with Dublin City. Shamrock Rovers are the most successful club in Irish footballing history.

Seasons

Key

Division shown in bold when it changes due to promotion or relegation. Top scorers shown in bold are players who finished the season as top scorer of their division.

Key to league record:
P = Played
W = Games won
D = Games drawn
L = Games lost
F = Goals for
A = Goals against
Pts = Points
Pos = Final position

Key to divisions:
Premier = LOI Premier Division
First = LOI First Division

Key to rounds:
DNQ = Did not qualify
QR = Qualifying Round
PR = Preliminary Round
R1 = First Round 
R2 = Second Round 
R3 = Third Round 
R4 = Fourth Round 
R5 = Fifth Round 

Grp = Group Stage
QF = Quarter-finals
SF = Semi-finals
RU = Runners-up
W = Winners

Notes
A.  Prior to 1985 there was just one division. Six new teams were introduced for the 1985–86 season and the league was split into two divisions.

B.  Shamrock Rovers reached the final of the inaugural FAI Cup in 1921–22 as a Leinster Senior League side and lost to St. James's Gate in a replay.

C.  The League of Ireland Shield was introduced in 1921 with the League of Ireland as League and FAI Cup fixtures were insufficient to last a full season. The club didn't compete in the inaugural Shield competition as it wasn't a member of the League. The competition usually comprised one round of fixtures, though it was also played over two rounds and on a knockout basis during certain seasons. The Shield was played on a sectional basis from 1969 to its abolition in 1973. The League of Ireland Cup replaced the Shield in 1973.

D.  Prior to UEFA's foundation in 1954, European competition was restricted to a number of different tournaments with limited entry which are not recognised as European Cups.

E.  Only League goals are counted, goals scored in other competitions are not included.

F.  Largest recorded attendance for a FAI Cup final of 44,238, Shamrock Rovers F.C. 1–0 Bohemian F.C., April 22 1945, Dalymount Park, Dublin.

G.  While the Inter-Cities Fairs Cup is considered to be the predecessor to the UEFA Cup, UEFA do not consider the tournament to be an official UEFA contest.

H.  Shamrock Rovers and Cork Hibernians were level on points at the end of the 1970–71 season. Cork Hibs won the resultant play-off for the title. The statistics above do not include that play-off.

I.  An experimental points system was operated for the 1981–82 season whereby a team was awarded four points for an away win, three points for a home win, two points for an away draw and one point for a home draw.

J.  In 1982–83 three points were awarded for a win and one point for a draw. The system reverted the following season to the pre-1981–82 system, i.e. two points for a win and one point for a draw.

K.  In 1992–93 the Premier Division 'split' into two sections of six after the 22nd series of games had been played on 17 January. Rovers did not qualify for the top six and finished in second place of the bottom six (Group 'B') or eighth place overall.

L.  The Premier Division was cut to 10 teams and shortened in length by maintaining only 3 rounds of fixtures in the 2002–03 season. The FAI Cup final was played in October '02 making it two FAI Cup finals in one year. The League Cup competition was not played. These measures were aimed at easing the transition from a "Winter schedule"(Autumn-Summer) to "Summer Soccer"(Spring-Winter).

References
Specific

General

 The Hoops by Paul Doolan and Robert Goggins

 
Shamrock Rovers